Foxon Park is a soft drink brand produced by Foxon Park Beverage Company. The company is located in East Haven, Connecticut. Their sodas are a traditional accompaniment to the New Haven-style pizza sold throughout the area. They are also served at Louis' Lunch. Flavors include: cream soda, white birch, grape, orange, ginger ale, kola, gassosa, lemon-lime, root beer, iron brew, strawberry, sparkling water, tonic water, and cherry. Foxon Park is noted for using natural ingredients as well as utilizing cane sugar as a sweetener, unlike most soft drinks which use high fructose corn syrup. Their slogan is "All-Ways in Good Taste."

History
Foxon Park was founded in 1922 in East Haven, Connecticut by Matteo Naclerio, an immigrant from Italy. The beverage company Naclerio opened was named after the Foxon Park section of East Haven, and is still located at its original location on Foxon Blvd. The company began by bottling water and delivering it to homes in the area. When there was a downturn in demand for bottled water due to the Depression, the company began making and delivering soda in 1929. Some unique flavors were offered, such as Iron Brew (a drink made famous in Scotland) and gassosa (a lemon-flavored Italian soda). Foxon Park still remains a family-owned business.

References

External links
 Official Foxon Park Website

American soft drinks
East Haven, Connecticut
Companies based in New Haven County, Connecticut
Drink companies of the United States
Food and drink companies based in Connecticut